Srirampura railway station is located in Srirampura village, Sheikhupura district of Punjab province, Pakistan.

See also
 List of railway stations in Pakistan
 Pakistan Railways

References

External links

Railway stations in Sheikhupura District
Railway stations on Shahdara Bagh–Chak Amru Branch Line